Hurricane High School is the only high school in Hurricane, Utah, United States. It enrolls students in grades 10-12 from Hurricane and surrounding communities, including La Verkin, Toquerville, Hildale, Virgin, Rockville, and Springdale. As of the 2021–2022 school year, there are 970 students enrolled. The student population has grown by 9% over the last five school years. In 2017, a total of 296 students graduated with an 89% graduation rate. USBE Data and Research 2017

Hurricane High's school colors are red and black. The school mascot is a tiger.

History
The first school classes were held in Hurricane in 1906 in the living room of Ira E. Bradshaw's home, consisting of grades one through eight. Hurricane's first high school class graduated in the 1927– school year.

A two-story red brick high school building was built during the Great Depression with help from the federal government's Works Progress Administration. The building was completed and the school opened just after Thanksgiving in 1936.

The school chose the colors red and black because those are the colors on a hurricane warning flag. The school then chose the tiger as their mascot as it was an animal that could be rendered easily in black and red.

In 1974, a new gymnasium and three classrooms were completed at the school site. Students walked between the old high school building and the new building for classes. In 1978, classrooms and a cafeteria were added, and grades 9-12 moved to the new building. The old building remained in use for other grades until it was demolished in the spring of 2004. An auditorium, auxiliary gym, and administrative office areas were added in 1996. In 2001, a science hall was added and named for the outgoing principal, Robert Goulding.

The school's enrollment growth forced an expansion of the existing building. The expansion opened in 2012.

Darin Thomas is the principal at Hurricane High School, replacing former principal, Jody Rich in 2018.

Hurricane High School Principals

Athletics 
Hurricane High is a part of Region 9 of the Utah High School Activities Association, and has teams in baseball, basketball, cross country, football, golf, swimming, softball, tennis, track & field, volleyball, and wrestling. The school also has a speech and debate team, and students from the school's music programs participate in the UHSAA's Solo and Ensemble competitions.

See also
 List of high schools in Utah

References

External links

 

Public high schools in Utah
Educational institutions established in 1924
Works Progress Administration in Utah
Schools in Washington County, Utah
1924 establishments in Utah